The 1944 United States presidential election in Utah took place on November 7, 1944 as part of the 1944 United States presidential election. All contemporary forty-eight states took part, and state voters selected four voters to the Electoral College, who voted for president and vice president.

The Democratic Party candidate, President Franklin D. Roosevelt, won the state of Utah with 60.44 percent of the popular vote. The Republican Party candidate, Thomas E. Dewey, garnered 39.42 percent of the popular vote. , this is the last election in which the following counties voted for a Democratic presidential candidate: Washington, Millard, Box Elder, Cache, and Rich. This is also the last time that a Democrat would carry the state by double-digits.

Results

Results by county

See also
 United States presidential elections in Utah

References

1944 Utah elections
Utah
1944